The United Arab Emirates competed at the 1988 Summer Olympics in Seoul, South Korea. Twelve competitors, all men, took part in fifteen events in two sports.

Competitors
The following is the list of number of competitors in the Games.

Cycling

Six cyclists represented the United Arab Emirates in 1988.

Men's road race
 Sultan Khalifa — 4:44:37 (→ 101st place) 
 Khalifa Bin Omair — did not finish (→ no ranking) 
 Issa Mohamed — did not finish (→ no ranking)

Men's team time trial
 Ali Al-Abed
 Ali Hayyaz
 Sultan Khalifa
 Naji Sayed

Swimming

Men's 50 m Freestyle
Ahmad Faraj
 Heat – 26.60 (→ did not advance, 63rd place)
Mubarak Farajbilal
 Heat – 27.60 (→ did not advance, 68th place)

Men's 100 m Freestyle
Mohammed Binabid
 Heat – 58.81 (→ did not advance, 72nd place)
Ahmad Faraj
 Heat – 59.10 (→ did not advance, 73rd place)

Men's 200 m Freestyle
Mohammed Binabid
 Heat – 2:09.43 (→ did not advance, 61st place)
Ahmad Faraj
 Heat – 2:13.21 (→ did not advance, 62nd place)

Men's 400 m Freestyle
Bassam Alansari
 Heat – 4:39.36 (→ did not advance, 47th place)
Mohammed Binabid
 Heat – 4:47.28 (→ did not advance, 49th place)

Men's 100 m Backstroke
Mohamed Abdullah
 Heat – 1:08.91 (→ did not advance, 49th place)
Mohammed Binabid
 Heat – 1:10.01 (→ did not advance, 51st place)

Men's 200 m Backstroke
Mohamed Abdullah
 Heat – 2:29.64 (→ did not advance, 39th place)
Mohammed Binabid
 Heat – 2:36.21 (→ did not advance, 40th place)

Men's 100 m Breaststroke
Obaid Alrumaithi
 Heat – 1:17.01 (→ did not advance, 60th place)

Men's 200 m Breaststroke
Obaid Alrumaithi
 Heat – 2:50.49 (→ did not advance, 52nd place)

Men's 100 m Butterfly
Mohammed Binabid
 Heat – 1:06.25 (→ did not advance, 49th place)

Men's 200 m Individual Medley
Mohammed Binabid
 Heat – 2:29.08 (→ did not advance, 53rd place)
Mohamed Abdullah
 Heat – 2:31.44 (→ did not advance, 55th place)

Men's 4 × 100 m Freestyle Relay
Ahmad Faraj, Mohamed Abdullah, Bassam Alansari, and Mohammed Binabid
 Heat – 3:58.92 (→ did not advance, 19th place)

Men's 4 × 200 m Freestyle Relay
Ahmad Faraj, Mohamed Abdullah, Bassam Alansari, and Mohammed Binabid
 Heat – 9:01.03 (→ did not advance, 14th place)

Men's 4 × 100 m Medley Relay
Mohamed Abdullah, Obaid Alrumaithi, Mohammed Binabid, and Ahmad Faraj
 Heat – 4:28.55 (→ did not advance, 25th place)

References

External links
Official Olympic Reports

Nations at the 1988 Summer Olympics
1988
Summer Olympics